65th Street may refer to:

New York City
65th Street (IRT Second Avenue Line), 
65th Street (IND Queens Boulevard Line)
65th Street Terminal (BMT Fifth Avenue Line)

Cleveland 
West 65th–Lorain station

See also
65th Street Yard